Grabež is a village in the municipality of Bihać, Bosnia and Herzegovina.

Demographics 
According to the 2013 census, it had no population, down from seven in 1991.

References

Populated places in Bihać